Jorge "Rivi" Ayala-Rivera is a  former hitman for Medellín Cartel leader, Griselda Blanco. In 1993, Ayala was sentenced to life in prison with the possibility of parole after 25 years.

Background
Jorge Ayala was born in Cali, Colombia but grew up in Chicago. He spoke perfect English and was born with a distinctive high-pitched voice.

While living in Chicago, he started off as a car mechanic for his father at General Motors. He soon became one of the biggest car thieves in the city, stealing cars for Chicago chop shops. As a side job, he also worked in bringing immigrants into the country over from Mexico.

Ayala was first brought to Miami in 1979 by a job that required him to transport a truck full of used guns from Chicago to Miami. Upon arriving with the shipment, he ended up deciding to live in the state. Ayala started off his criminal career here by simply shaking people down as a "small-time" enforcer.

Working for Blanco and the Medellín Cartel
Ayala was considered to be Griselda Blanco's top enforcer. He led a small crew which helped him carry out various crimes. Rivi's  brother, Alonso Ayala, also worked as a sicario for Blanco.

Killings
Ayala pleaded guilty to three killings in 1993, but was believed to be responsible for roughly three dozen murders that took place throughout the Miami Drug War.

Johnnie Castro
In 1982, Griselda Blanco ordered Ayala to kill Jesus “Chucho” Castro, one of her former enforcers. According to George Cadavid, a Miami police homicide detective, she wanted Castro dead after he had been hired to protect a drug supplier, but refused to carry out an unspecified order. However, Ayala claims that Blanco wanted Castro dead supposedly for an offense against one of her sons.

The attempt on Castro's life occurred on February 6 that same year. That afternoon, Miguelito Perez and Jorge Ayala drove up to the side of Jesus Castro's vehicle - while he was stopped at a red light - and performed a drive-by shooting with a silenced machine gun. The bullets, however, missed Jesus Castro and accidentally hit his two-year-old son, Johnny, who was unknowingly present in the car with him.

Ayala was charged with the murder of Castro's son in August 1988.

Alfredo and Grizel Lorenzo
Acting on orders of Griselda Blanco, Ayala and his crew killed drug-dealing married couple Alfredo and Grizel Lorenzo in their South Miami home on May 26, 1982. Their killings were the apparent result of a cocaine shipment which the couple had received from Blanco, but failed to pay her for. According to Ayala, Griselda Blanco had originally ordered the murder of everyone in the house, but he made sure that the kids of Alfredo and Grizel Lorenzo were not harmed.

Additional murders
Jorge Ayala is said to have killed 11 members of Luis Mejia's gang in New York City during the summer of 1981 as well as Mejia's father, Octavio Mejia, in Miami that same year.
Ayala once told state prosecutors that in 1981 he accepted a $50,000 payment for killing a man for Blanco while her then-3-year-old son, Michael, was in the room.

Law enforcement apprehension
Jorge Ayala was arrested in connection with a Chicago bank robbery. It was during this time that authorities were also searching for Griselda Blanco's top hitman, whom they only knew by the name of "Riverita". Soon after his capture, they realized that he was the assassin they had been looking for.

Trial and sentencing
Ayala made an agreement with Florida district attorney's office to testify against Griselda Blanco who had been charged with 3 counts of first-degree murder, but the case fell apart and was ultimately dismissed due to Ayala being involved in phone sex scandal with 2 secretaries that worked in the state's attorney's office. Ayala pleaded guilty in 1993 to three murders and was sentenced to life in prison with the possibility of parole after 25 years. If released, Ayala will be deported to Colombia.

In popular culture
A character based on Ayala, renamed to "Rudy", was briefly featured in Cocaine Godmother, a 2017 TV film loosely based on the life of Griselda Blanco Restrepo.

References 

Living people
People from Cali
Prisoners sentenced to life imprisonment by Florida
Medellín Cartel traffickers
Colombian people convicted of murder
Prisoners and detainees of Florida
Contract killers
Bank robbers
1964 births